Pontus Rödin (born 16 August 2000) is a Swedish footballer who plays for Brage.

References

External links
Pontus Rödin at SvFF

Living people
2000 births
Association football defenders
Swedish footballers
Sweden youth international footballers
FC Linköping City players
AFC Eskilstuna players
IK Brage players
Allsvenskan players
Superettan players
Sportspeople from Linköping
Footballers from Östergötland County